Stone Flower may refer to:

 The Stone Flower, a Russian Ural folk tale
 The Stone Flower (1946 film), the first Soviet movie in color
 The Stone Flower (1977 film), 1977 animated adaptation of the story
 The Stone Flower (Fridlender), a ballet based on the folk tale
 The Tale of the Stone Flower (Prokofiev), a ballet
 Stone Flower (sculpture), a sculpture by Bogdan Bogdanovic
 The Stone Flower Fountain, in Moscow, Russia
 Stone Flower (album), a 1970 album by Antonio Carlos Jobim
 Stone Flower, Santana cover of Antonio Carlos Jobim song on Caravanserai
 Stone Flower Records, a record label established by Sly Stone of Sly & the Family Stone
 The Stone Flower, a 1982 novel by Alan Scholefield
 Black stone flower, Parmotrema perlatum, a lichen dried and used as a spice ingredient in India
 Stone flower, a herb used in Ayurvedic medicine
 Lithops, also called pebble plants or living stones